Khasm Alan Air base is an airbase of the Saudi Arabian National Guard located east of Riyadh, Riyadh Governorate, Saudi Arabia.

The base is home to the 1st Aviation Brigade.

References

Airports in Saudi Arabia
2017 establishments in Saudi Arabia
Airports established in 2017